Champaknagar Model School and College is a higher secondary school at Champaknagar, Bijoynagar, Brahmanbaria District, Bangladesh. This school offers from 6th grade to 12th grade, averaging 11–18 years of age. Over 1500 students study here and it is a single shifted and co-educational school. This is a well known school in Brahmanbaria District.

References 

Schools in Brahmanbaria District
Educational institutions established in 1965
High schools in Bangladesh
1965 establishments in East Pakistan